The Renault Zoom was a concept car created by Matra and Renault and was first introduced at the 1992 Paris Motor Show.

The Zoom was powered by a 45 kW (61.2 hp) electric motor. It was unique in having fold up rear wheels resulting in a shorter length  when parked. Width remains constant at 1.52m, which means Zoom is  higher in retracted wheelbase configuration. 2 scissor doors mounted on inclined axes reduce lateral bodywork clearance to a minimum and make Zoom easy to use in the tightest of spots.

The Zoom was an urban and suburban concept car born of common research by Renault and Matra into modern electric cars. The Zoom was a relatively early venture into the world of city runabouts and utilised an electric power system in addition to a variable wheelbase. The engine is 90 percent recyclable. A communication centre mounted between the two seats houses a hands-free telephone and power-up control for Carminat navigation system.

The concept for a variable wheelbase city car was revisited by the MIT CityCar and applied in the development of the Hiriko folding two-seat urban electric car. It did not go into production due to it being a concept but also not attracting serious interest going into production.

References

Matra vehicles
Zoom
Electric concept cars
Front-wheel-drive vehicles
Cars introduced in 1992
Subcompact cars
Hatchbacks